In 1892, Mrs. Stanford made a gift to Monterey, the Statue of Junípero Serra's monument that was installed in Lower Presidio Park, Monterey, California, United States.  

The memorial was vandalized and decapitated, in 2015.

References

External links

 

Buildings and structures in Monterey, California
Monuments and memorials in California
Outdoor sculptures in California
Sculptures of men in California
Statues in California
Vandalized works of art in California
Monterey, California